Agnete Kristin Johnsen (born 4 July 1994), also known as Agnete Saba, or simply Agnete, is a Norwegian singer and songwriter. Johnsen is best known for being the lead singer of the Norwegian teen punk band The BlackSheeps. She represented Norway in the Eurovision Song Contest 2016 as a solo artist with the song "Icebreaker".

Life and career

Early life and career
Johnsen was born on 4 July 1994 in Varangerbotn, Nesseby, located in Finnmark, Norway. She is an ethnic Sami and the daughter of Sami children's author Signe Iversen.

The BlackSheeps were formed in 2008 while its members were attending school in their hometown of Nesseby. They later won Melodi Grand Prix Junior 2008 with their song "Oro jaska, beana" ("Be quiet, dog") which was performed in both Norwegian and Northern Sami. The band later performed at MGP Nordic 2008 and won the competition. "Oro jaska, beana" went on to win Song of the Year at the Spellemannprisen Awards and peaked at number-one on the Norwegian singles chart.

In 2011, the band were announced as one of the competing acts in Melodi Grand Prix 2011 with the song "Dance Tonight", where they placed second. They later split up the same year.

In 2013, Agnete competed in the second season of the Norwegian music TV-competition , where she placed second in the finale against Silya Nymoen. The same year she also performed as an interval act during Melodi Grand Prix Junior 2013.

2014–present: Skal vi danse? 
In 2014, Johnsen was announced as one of the competing celebrities in the tenth season of the Norwegian version of Dancing with the Stars, called Skal vi danse? (Shall we dance?). She went on to win the competition. In 2015, she participated in the Norwegian reality television series , but withdrew early in the season because of mental health problems. Her debut Album is set to be called NATURE due to the topics of its tracks.

Eurovision Song Contest 2016
On 19 January 2016, Johnsen was announced as one of the ten competing acts in Melodi Grand Prix 2016 with the song "Icebreaker". In the final, held on 27 February, she was declared the winner after receiving 166,728 votes from the Norwegian public. She represented Norway in the Eurovision Song Contest 2016 performing on May 12, 2016, during the second semi-final held in Stockholm, but failed to qualify to the May 14 final.

Discography

Extended plays

Singles

As lead artist

As featured artist

References

1994 births
Living people
Norwegian pop singers
Norwegian women singers
Melodi Grand Prix winners
People from Nesseby
Norwegian Sámi people
Norwegian Sámi musicians
Eurovision Song Contest entrants for Norway
Eurovision Song Contest entrants of 2016
21st-century Norwegian singers
21st-century Norwegian women singers